Michael Richards (born July 5, 1975) is an American former television producer, game show host, and television personality. He was the executive producer of the American television game shows Let's Make a Deal and The Price Is Right from 2009 to 2019, and of Jeopardy! and Wheel of Fortune from 2020 to 2021.

In August 2021, Richards briefly succeeded Alex Trebek as the third host of the daily syndicated version of Jeopardy! after his death from pancreatic cancer on November 8, 2020 but resigned as host later that month after hosting only a week's worth of episodes. The resignation came in the wake of ongoing criticism over offensive comments that he made on a podcast called The Randumb Show before hosting the show, as well as concerns about wrongful termination and sexual harassment lawsuits from models during his time as the executive producer of The Price Is Right.

Early life
Richards was born in Burbank, California, and attended Pepperdine University.

Career
Richards was the second host of Beauty and the Geek and produced numerous game shows, including Weakest Link. He later hosted seasons of High School Reunion.

Until the end of the 2018–19 season, Richards was the executive producer of The Price Is Right and Let's Make a Deal for a decade. He was also a candidate to host The Price Is Right before Drew Carey was chosen. In interviews of those two shows, Richards was described as "exclusionary and dismissive of longtime show employees"; he fired announcer Rich Fields and held on-air auditions, similar to the ones he later used on Jeopardy!, to hire George Gray as Fields's replacement, also dismissing longtime producer (and longtime right-hand man of Bob Barker) Roger Dobkowitz. Richards often neglected Deal and was frequently absent from day-to-day operations. A post-producer was fired after sarcastically making an introduction, which drew attention to Richards's absences. Richards hosted GSN's 2012 revival of The Pyramid and the network's 2017–18 version of Divided.

During this period, Richards hosted a podcast, The Randumb Show, which was promoted as a look at the production of Price. According to reporting by The Ringer's Claire McNear, Richards, "repeatedly used offensive language and disparaged women's bodies". The Anti-Defamation League criticized his disparaging stereotyping of women, Jews, Asians, and the disabled on the podcast, and called for an investigation. Asked for comment in 2021, Richards apologized for the material and took the podcast offline.

Wrongful termination and sexual harassment lawsuits 
Richards was the subject of a wrongful termination lawsuit in 2010. Brandi Cochran, a model on The Price Is Right, alleged that CBS and FremantleMedia discriminated against her by firing her after she became pregnant with twins. The Hollywood Reporter stated that Richards made a disparaging comment about her pregnancy at a 2008 party, and that he claimed that she was fired from the show because Richards thought that she "would not take us to great." In 2011, model Lanisha Cole filed a lawsuit against Richards and fellow producer Adam Sandler (not to be confused with actor and comedian Adam Sandler) for wrongful termination and berating her in front of her peers.

At Sony Pictures Television 
Richards left both Price and Deal in 2019 and joined Sony Pictures Television, where he was assigned to the ABC primetime return of Who Wants to Be a Millionaire as an executive producer alongside host Jimmy Kimmel and Michael Davies for the nine-episode first season of the show during the 2019–20 season. Richards also served as the executive producer for the 2021 GSN revival series of Chain Reaction. For the 2020–21 season, Richards succeeded Harry Friedman as executive producer of Wheel of Fortune and Jeopardy!

After Jeopardy! host Alex Trebek died on November 8, 2020, Richards appeared at the start of the November 9 episode to pay tribute to him. Richards later filled in for two weeks as a guest host of the show, with his first episode airing on February 22, 2021. On August 4, it was reported that Richards had entered "advanced negotiations" to become the permanent host, though with other candidates still in contention. After that announcement, a lawsuit filed against Richards and others during his tenure as the executive producer of The Price Is Right resurfaced, causing controversy. On August 11, it was announced that Richards would succeed Trebek as host of the daily show, with Jeopardy! guest host Mayim Bialik hosting future prime-time specials and spinoffs. However, on August 20, it was announced that Richards would step down after offensive comments he had made in the past emerged. The five episodes Richards filmed the previous day, the show's first day of production on the new season, aired in September.

Despite speculations that Richards would resign as executive producer of Wheel of Fortune and Jeopardy! after the scandal, he retained that role at both shows with the full backing of Sony Pictures and the head of its television division, Ravi Ahuja. However, on August 31, 2021, a week and a half after Richards resigned as permanent host, he was fired as executive producer of both Jeopardy! and Wheel of Fortune. Michael Davies from Embassy Row served as interim executive producer for Jeopardy! following Richards's departure, and on April 14, 2022, was announced to be taking the role full-time. On March 23, 2022, it was announced that Bellamie Blackstone would take over the executive producer role for Wheel of Fortune. Bialik and Ken Jennings were eventually chosen as co-hosts for the syndicated version of Jeopardy! on July 27, 2022.

Personal life 
Richards is married to Stephanie Richards. He has two sons.

Filmography

Notes

References

External links 
 
 The Randumb Show podcast backup, on Internet Archive

1975 births
2021 controversies in the United States
American game show hosts
Jeopardy!
Living people
People from Burbank, California
Pepperdine University alumni
Television personalities from California
Television producers from California